Northern Saving Fund and Safe Deposit Company, also known as Provident National Bank, is a historic bank building located in the Callowhill neighborhood of Philadelphia, Pennsylvania.  The original section was built in 1872–1873, and is a two-story, light grey granite building.  Additions were built in 1888 and 1903.

It was added to the National Register of Historic Places in 1977.

References

External links

Bank buildings on the National Register of Historic Places in Philadelphia
Historic American Buildings Survey in Philadelphia
Commercial buildings completed in 1903